Black Lens News is a monthly African-American newspaper based in Spokane, Washington. It was founded in 2015 by Sandra Williams who acts as the newspaper's publisher and editor. Williams, who partly grew up in the Spokane area, remembered that the region used to have the newspaper African American Voice, which covered topics relevant to the Black community. She got the idea for creating a new newspaper for the Black community while her father was dying and came out with the first issue in January 2015. A U.S. Justice Department report noting the disproportionate use of force on African Americans in Spokane shaped her vision for the paper, and was the focus of its first lead story. The newspaper was originally twelve pages and has expanded to 20. It contains Black news highlights from other sources both local and in the larger world as well as local sections such as its "It Takes a Village" section which highlights accomplishments of local people and a regular column "Thoughts from a Grandmother". The newspaper primarily circulates through Black churches and businesses and contains a directory of Black-owned businesses.

References

External links
 Official Website

African-American newspapers
Mass media in Spokane, Washington
Newspapers published in Washington (state)